Stans is a Swiss railway station in the municipality of Stans in the canton of Nidwalden. It is on the Luzern–Stans–Engelberg line, owned by the Zentralbahn railway company.

Services 
The following services stop at Stans:

 Lucerne S-Bahn:
 : rush-hour service to Lucerne.

References

External links 
 

Railway stations in the canton of Nidwalden
Stans